James Dearman (born c.1808 and christened 31 January 1808 at Darnall, Sheffield; died 3 September 1854) was an English  professional cricketer who played first-class cricket from 1826 to 1846.

An all-rounder and occasional wicket-keeper who was mainly associated with Sheffield, he made 22 known appearances in first-class matches.  He represented the North in the North v. South series. A small man, 5 ft 4in tall, he and his brother Charles played in Sheffield matches up to 1846, and one of them may have appeared in a Marsden match in 1826. Originally a filesmith living in Sheffield, he moved to Darnell in 1835, where he kept the inn and cricket ground, his wife continuing to run the ground after his death.

In 1838, Dearman challenged Alfred Mynn for the single wicket "championship of England".  They played two matches at Town Malling and Sheffield.  Both were won by Mynn.  Dearman was so small beside Mynn that they were dubbed "David and Goliath".

References

1808 births
1854 deaths
English cricketers
English cricketers of 1826 to 1863
North v South cricketers
Single wicket cricketers
Cricketers from Sheffield
Sheffield Cricket Club cricketers
People from Darnall